August Priske Flyger (born 23 March 2004) is a Danish professional footballer who plays for Jong PSV in the Eerste Divisie on loan from FC Midtjylland. He is the son of former Danish international footballer Brian Priske.

Career
Priske went on loan from FC Midtjylland to PSV Eindhoven in September 2021. He started playing for their under-18 team and made his senior debut for Jong PSV in the Eerste Divisie in January 2022, scoring on his debut in a 5-1 win against Almere City.The loan was repeated for the 2022-23 season but PSV stipulated an option to buy in the deal.

International career
Priske has represented the Denmark national under-19 football team.

Personal life
He is the son of football manager and former Danish international football player Brian Priske.

References

External links
  

2004 births
Living people
Danish men's footballers
Association football forwards
Jong PSV players
Eerste Divisie players
Danish expatriate men's footballers
Danish expatriate sportspeople in the Netherlands
Expatriate footballers in the Netherlands